Catherine Place (also called Catherine) is an unincorporated community in Madison County, in the U.S. state of Missouri.

The community derives its name from Catherine Cantwell, the wife of the proprietor of a nearby mine.

References

Unincorporated communities in Madison County, Missouri
Unincorporated communities in Missouri